The 1933–34 Kansas Jayhawks men's basketball team represented the University of Kansas during the 1933–34 college men's basketball season.

Roster
Theodore O'Leary
Leland Page
William Johnson
Ernest Vanek
Elmer Schaake
Paul Harrington
Robert Curd
Fred Harris
Gordon Gray
Ray Ebling
Lester Kappelman
Wilmer Shaffer
Dick Wells
Milton Allen
Robert Oyler

Schedule

References

Kansas Jayhawks men's basketball seasons
Kansas
Kansas
Kansas